Pasaveh (also Romanized as Pasāveh; also known as Khvārazm and Pasāva ) is a village in Dasht-e Taybad Rural District, Miyan Velayat District, Taybad County, Razavi Khorasan Province, Iran. At the 2006 census, its population was 904, in 205 families.

References 

Populated places in Taybad County